The 2014 National Lacrosse League season, the 28th in the history of the NLL, began on December 28, 2013 and ended on May 31, 2014, the date of Game 2 and 3 of the championship series. After finishing the regular season atop the East Division, the Rochester Knighthawks continued winning in the playoffs and took their third consecutive Champion's Cup, the first time a team has won the league title three straight years.

Milestones and events

Pre-season
 March 15, 2013: Midway through the 2013 season, the league announced that the schedule would expand from 16 games to 18 games in 2014.
 June 27, 2013: The NLL announced that the Washington Stealth would relocate to Langley, British Columbia for 2014. It was later announced that the team would be known as the Vancouver Stealth.
 August 23, 2013: IL Indoor reported that the Minnesota Swarm would be moving back to the Eastern division. The Swarm played in the East from 2005-2008 before moving to the West.
 August 23, 2013: IL Indoor also reported that the playoff structure would be changing in 2014. The top three teams, not four, in each division would make the playoffs. Each division winner would receive a bye in the first round while the second- and third-place teams played a one-game division semi-final. The winner would play the division winner in a two-game playoff series. If one team won both games, they would win the series, otherwise the teams would play a 10-minute game to decide the series. If the teams are still tied after 10 minutes, they would play sudden-death overtime. The Championship would be decided by a similar two-game series.
 October 22, 2013: The NLL and the PLPA announced that they had agreed on a new Collective Bargaining Agreement. The new agreement covers the 2014 through 2020 NLL seasons, and includes the previously reported move of the Swarm to the Eastern division as well as the two-game playoff series. Highlights of the CBA include no pay increases for players during the first two years of the agreement, reduction in the size of player rosters and the number of players who dress for games, reduction in the age for free agency from 32 to 30, and the ability for players to reject the "franchise player" designation.

Regular season
 February 22, 2014: Toronto Rock forward Colin Doyle scored his 499th and 500th goals in Toronto's victory over the Minnesota Swarm.
 March 1, 2014: Just a week after scoring his 500th goal, Colin Doyle recorded his 800th assist and 1300th point in the NLL.
 March 4, 2014: After a 4-7 start, the Colorado Mammoth fired head coach Bob Hamley and assistant coaches Ed Comeau and Sean Ferris.
 March 14, 2014: The Edmonton Rush clinched a playoff berth with a 15-7 road win against the Calgary Roughnecks which gave them a 10-0 record. It is the third straight playoff appearance for the Rush.
 March 16, 2014: The Rochester Knighthawks clinched a playoff berth with an 11-7 road win against the Philadelphia Wings which gave them a 9-3 record. It is the fourth straight playoff appearance for the Knighthawks.
 March 21, 2014: The Edmonton Rush clinched no worse than home-turf advantage for the division semifinals with a 14-5 win at home over the Buffalo Bandits which gave the Rush an 11-0 record. The home playoff game will be the first in franchise history.
 March 30, 2014: The Rochester Knighthawks with a record of 9-4 clinched no worse than home-turf advantage for the division semifinals when the Edmonton Rush won 13-10 on the road against the Toronto Rock. It will be the third straight year the NLL Playoffs have come to Rochester. The loss by the Rock also clinched a playoff berth for the Buffalo Bandits with a record of 8-5, their first playoff appearance since 2012.
 April 5, 2014: John Tavares scored his league-record 800th goal in the Bandits' loss to Calgary. The 16-13 road win by the Roughnecks improved their record to 10-5, clinched them a playoff berth and guaranteed them no worse than home-turf advantage in the division semifinals. It is the 12th straight playoff appearance for the Roughnecks and the eighth consecutive year the NLL Playoffs will visit Calgary.
 April 5, 2014: The Edmonton Rush clinched the West Division regular-season title as well as the league's best overall regular-season record with a 12-11 home victory over the Colorado Mammoth which gave the Rush a 14-0 record. It is the first regular-season division title for the Rush.
 April 11, 2014: The longest season-opening winning streak in NLL history comes to an end, as the Colorado Mammoth hand the Edmonton Rush their first loss of the year, 10-8 at Pepsi Center. The Rush began the season with 14 straight wins.
 April 12, 2014: The Toronto Rock clinched a playoff berth with a 10-9 win at home against the Philadelphia Wings that improved their record to 7-9. It is the fifth straight playoff appearance for the Rock.
 April 12, 2014: The Rochester Knighthawks who had improved their record to 12-4 with a win earlier in the evening clinched the East Division regular-season title when the Buffalo Bandits lost 10-9 on the road against the Minnesota Swarm. It is the first time the Knighthawks have finished the regular season atop their division since 2007.
 April 19, 2014: The Colorado Mammoth clinch a playoff berth with an 18-12 road win over the Minnesota Swarm which improved their record to 7-10. In the game, John Grant, Jr. became the third player in league history to reach the 600 career goal plateau. It is the fourth straight playoff appearance for the Mammoth.
 April 26, 2014: The Toronto Rock clinched home-turf for the East Division Semifinal with an 8-6 road win against the Minnesota Swarm that evened their record at 9-9. It is the fifth straight year the NLL Playoffs have come to Toronto.

Playoffs
 May 3, 2014: The division semifinal playoff games were played with the Buffalo Bandits defeating the Toronto Rock on the road and the Calgary Roughnecks winning in overtime at home against the Colorado Mammoth. The win for the Bandits snapped their season-ending 8-game losing streak.
 May 10, 2014: The first multiple-game playoff series since the 1998 NLL Championship Series began as the Rochester Knighthawks visited the Buffalo Bandits in Game 1 of the East Finals, and the Edmonton Rush visited the Calgary Roughnecks in Game 1 of the West Finals.
 May 16, 2014: In the first NLL division finals series to conclude under the newly adopted format, the Edmonton Rush won Game 2 at home to force the 10-minute Game 3 which started at 9:20 pm PDT. The Calgary Roughnecks scored 2 goals in the first three minutes of Game 3 and held on for a 2-1 win in the NLL's first mini-game. The first goal ever scored in a mini-game came from Shawn Evans.
 May 17, 2014: Just as Edmonton did the previous day, the Rochester Knighthawks also won Game 2 at home to force the 10-minute Game 3 which started at 9:45 pm EDT. The Knighthawks and Buffalo Bandits exchanged goals in regulation time of Game 3. It took 2:08 for Cory Vitarelli to score the first series-winning, deciding mini-game overtime goal under the new playoff format for Rochester.
 May 24, 2014: The Champion's Cup Finals got underway with the Calgary Roughnecks winning Game 1 at home against the Rochester Knighthawks in front of 16,541 fans. Dane Dobbie was the game's first star leading the Roughnecks offensively with three goals and an assist on 10 shots. He also collected two loose balls. Roughnecks' goaltender Mike Poulin had 36 saves and collected a loose ball to record the win. Craig Point had two goals on nine shots to take third star honors for the Knighthawks. The Roughnecks jumped out in front 1-0 less than three minutes into the game and 2-0 less than 10 minutes in. The Knighthawks got within a goal twice at 4-3 in the second quarter and 7-6 late in the third quarter. But the Roughnecks scored the first three goals of the fourth quarter to ice the game.
 May 31, 2014: In Game 2 of the Champion's Cup Finals, the Rochester Knighthawks broke open a tight game by scoring the first four goals of the fourth quarter in less than six minutes to extend their lead to five goals over the Calgary Roughnecks. The Knighthawks ended with a 6-1 advantage in the fourth quarter leading them to a 16-10 victory in front of 9,188 home fans. Dan Dawson led the way for the Knighthawks with three goals and four assists on nine shots and was named the game's first star. Cody Jamieson chipped in with three goals and three assists on eight shots while retrieving four loose balls. Stephen Keogh had three goals and an assist on nine shots with six loose balls. Paul Dawson and Dylan Evans each scooped up seven loose balls. Evans also won 15 of 28 (54%) faceoffs. Knighthawks netminder Matt Vinc had 38 saves to record the win. In the ensuing Game 3, the Roughnecks jumped out to an early 2-0 lead in the first five minutes on goals by Shawn Evans and Curtis Dickson. However, less than four minutes later, the Knighthawks tied the game on goals by Craig Point and Joe Walters. Just 24 seconds after the Knighthawks tied the game, they took the lead on another goal by Point with 59 seconds to play. Dylan Evans collected three loose balls and won five of six (83%) faceoffs in the mini-game. Vinc had seven saves to record the win. Point took first-star honors for the mini-game. With the victory, the Knighthawks became the first team in NLL history to win three consecutive league championships. Dawson, who missed Game 1 with a chest injury he suffered in the East Finals, was named Champion's Cup Finals Most Valuable Player.

Final standings

Playoffs

* = overtime

Division Finals and Champion's Cup Final individual game results

East Division Finals
Saturday May 10 - Game 1 at First Niagara Center, Buffalo, New York: Buffalo Bandits 12, Rochester Knighthawks 8
Saturday May 17 - Game 2 at Blue Cross Arena, Rochester, New York: Rochester Knighthawks 13, Buffalo Bandits 8
Saturday May 17 - Game 3 at Blue Cross Arena, Rochester, New York: Rochester Knighthawks 2, Buffalo Bandits 1, overtime
Rochester wins series, 2-1.

West Division Finals
Saturday May 10 - Game 1 at Scotiabank Saddledome, Calgary, Alberta: Calgary Roughnecks 12, Edmonton Rush 11, overtime
Friday May 16 - Game 2 at Rexall Place, Edmonton, Alberta: Edmonton Rush 15, Calgary Roughnecks 13
Friday May 16 - Game 3 at Rexall Place, Edmonton, Alberta: Calgary Roughnecks 2, Edmonton Rush 1
Calgary wins series, 2-1.

Champion's Cup
Saturday May 24 - Game 1 at Scotiabank Saddledome, Calgary, Alberta: Calgary Roughnecks 10, Rochester Knighthawks 7
Saturday May 31 - Game 2 at Blue Cross Arena, Rochester, New York: Rochester Knighthawks 16, Calgary Roughnecks 10
Saturday May 31 - Game 3 at Blue Cross Arena, Rochester, New York: Rochester Knighthawks 3, Calgary Roughnecks 2
Rochester wins series, 2-1.

Regular-season results table

Awards

Annual awards
For the first time, the winners of the NLL's annual awards were not announced during the playoffs. Instead, three finalists for each award were announced during the two weeks following the final Championship game. The winners were announced at the first-ever NLL Season Awards Ceremony on September 21, 2014.

All-Rookie team
 Robert Church, Edmonton
 Tyler Digby, Vancouver
 Karsen Leung, Calgary
 Logan Schuss, Minnesota
 Garrett Thul, Philadelphia
 Dillon Ward, Colorado

All-Pro teams

First team
 Cody Jamieson, Rochester
 Shawn Evans, Calgary
 Garrett Billings, Toronto
 Jordan MacIntosh, Minnesota
 Kyle Rubisch, Edmonton
 Matt Vinc, Rochester

Second team
 Dane Dobbie, Calgary
 Adam Jones, Colorado
 Curtis Dickson, Calgary
 Brodie Merrill, Philadelphia
 Chris Corbeil, Edmonton
 Aaron Bold, Edmonton

Monthly awards
Awards are given out monthly for the best overall player and best rookie.

Statistics leaders
Bold numbers indicate new single-season records. Italics indicate tied single-season records.

Stadiums and locations

See also
 2014 in sports

References

14
National Lacrosse League